Oora is the fifth album by psychedelic rock group, the Edgar Broughton Band, first released in 1973. It was the Broughtons' last album for Harvest Records.

The original vinyl album came in an elaborate package, with a conventional gatefold album jacket enclosed in a transparent vinyl sleeve printed with the group's name and band pictures. The 2004 CD reissue featured one additional track.

Track listing

Side one
 "Hurricane Man / Rock 'n' Roller" (R.E. Broughton) - 6:13
 "Roccococooler" (R.E. Broughton) - 3:09
 "Eviction" (S. Broughton) - 3:00
 "Oh You Crazy Boy!" (Victor Unitt) - 2:44
 "Things on My Mind" (S. Broughton) - 3:39

Side two
"Exhibits from a New Museum / Green Lights" (R.E. Broughton) - 7:54
 "Face from a Window / Pretty / Hi-Jack Boogie / Slow Down" (R.E. Broughton, S. Broughton, Arthur Grant, Unitt) - 10:29
 "Capers" (R.E. Broughton, S. Broughton, Grant, Unitt) - 1:37

Bonus track on 2004 CD reissue
"Sweet Fallen Angels" (R.E. Broughton) - 2:51

Personnel
Edgar Broughton Band
 Edgar Broughton – lead vocals, guitar, bass guitar on "Hi-Jack Boogie"
 Arthur Grant – bass guitar, guitar on "Hurricane Man" and "Hi-Jack Boogie"
 Steve Broughton – vocals, drums, percussion, guitars, tubular bells, tambourine
 Victor Unitt – backing vocals, guitars, Spanish guitar on "Exhibits from a New Museum", piano, lead vocals on "Oh You Crazy Boy!"
Guest musicians
 Madeline Bell – backing vocals on "Rock 'n' Roller", "Things On My Mind" and "Face from a Window"
 Doris Troy – backing vocals on "Rock 'n' Roller", "Things On My Mind" and "Face from a Window"
 Lisa Strike – backing vocals on "Rock 'n' Roller", "Things On My Mind" and "Face from a Window"
 Maggie Thomas – backing vocals on "Oh You Crazy Boy!"
 David Bedford – piano on "Green Lights", strong and wind arrangements
Victor Peraino - synthesizer
Technical
Alan O'Duffy - recording
Rufus Cartwright - mixing
Chris Smith - sleeve design concept
Barney Bubbles - artwork
Hipgnosis - centre fold photography

Albums with cover art by Hipgnosis
Edgar Broughton Band albums
1973 albums
Harvest Records albums
Albums recorded at Olympic Sound Studios
Albums recorded at Morgan Sound Studios